Nußdorf am Haunsberg is a municipality in the district of Salzburg-Umgebung in the state of Salzburg in Austria.

Geography
The municipality lies in the northern part of the Flachgau on the northwest side of the Haunsberg in the Oichten valley, about 20 km north of the city of Salzburg.

References

Cities and towns in Salzburg-Umgebung District